Qatar has competed in 10 Summer Olympic Games. They have never competed in the Winter Olympic Games. Their first ever Olympic gold medal was won by Fares El-Bakh in weightlifting at the 2020 Summer Olympics, followed by a gold medal for Mutaz Essa Barshim in men's high jump. They have also won one silver and four bronze medals.

Following the 2008 Summer Olympics, Qatar was, along with Saudi Arabia and Brunei, one of only three countries never to have sent a female athlete to the Olympic Games. The International Olympic Committee in 2010 announced it would "press" these countries  to allow and facilitate women's participation, and shortly thereafter the Qatar Olympic Committee announced that it "hoped to send up to four female athletes in shooting and fencing" to the 2012 London Summer Olympics. The country ultimately included four female athletes in its delegation.

The Qatar Olympic Committee was formed in 1979 and recognized by the IOC in 1980.

Medals

Medals by Summer Games

Medals by sport

Athletes with most medals 
Only one Qatari athlete has won multiple medals in the history of the Olympic Games: he is track and field in the high jump Mutaz Essa Barshim.  

Notes: in Khaki the athletes still in activity.

List of medalists

See also
 List of flag bearers for Qatar at the Olympics
 Qatar at the Paralympics

References

External links
 
 
 
 "Qatar using black gold to tap into top performers", The Guardian, December 13, 2005 (on Olympic competitors from various countries switching to Qatari citizenship)